The Golden Cage is a 1933 British drama film directed by Ivar Campbell and starring Anne Grey, Anthony Kimmins and Frank Cellier. The film was made at Shepperton Studios as a quota quickie for distribution by MGM. A woman marries a wealthy man but is still secretly in love with a much poorer man.

Cast
 Anne Grey as Venetia Doxford  
 Anthony Kimmins as Paul Mortimer  
 Frank Cellier as Julian Sande  
 Mackenzie Ward as Claude Barrington

References

Bibliography
Wood, Linda. British Films, 1927–1939. British Film Institute, 1986.

External links

1933 films
1933 drama films
British drama films
Films set in England
Films shot at Shepperton Studios
Films directed by Ivar Campbell
British black-and-white films
1930s English-language films
1930s British films